The list of ship launches in 1947 includes a chronological list of all ships launched in 1947.


References 

Sources

1947
Ship launches